Tymon Dogg (born Stephen John Murray) is an English singer-songwriter and multi-instrumentalist. Dogg's career started early with shows at the Cavern and Peppermint Lounge in Liverpool when he was 15. As well as pursuing a solo career, he collaborated with many bands and musicians including The Clash, and was a member of Joe Strummer's last band, The Mescaleros.

Career
Dogg moved to London at 17, signed to Pye Records (under the name Timon) and recorded a single, "The Bitter Thoughts of Little Jane" featuring then-session musicians Jimmy Page and John Paul Jones. Moving to Apple Records, Dogg recorded tracks produced by Peter Asher featuring Paul McCartney on piano and James Taylor on guitar. Dogg then toured with The Moody Blues and worked closely with Justin Hayward to produce many tracks, "Now She Says She's Young" being released as a single in 1970.

Dogg became part of London's early 1970s underground scene. Moving into a squatted property in Westbourne Grove, Dogg made a living playing in folk clubs and busking with house mate Joe Strummer. Dogg regularly played at the Charlie Pig Dog Club with the 101ers and when Joe Strummer joined The Clash, Dogg was invited to contribute tracks on Sandinista! and Combat Rock.

Other notable housemates from that time included all female punk band The Slits. In 1978, Dogg moved to the North East of England with artist Helen Cherry. Dogg released Battle of Wills during the 1980s. In 2000, Dogg met up with Joe Strummer again at the Poetry Olympics curated by Michael Horovitz. The two performed an impromptu set of songs together, with Lily Allen in her début stage performance as backing singer.

Shortly afterwards, Dogg joined Strummer's band, The Mescaleros, and the two worked together until Strummer's death in 2002 producing songs such as "Mondo Bongo" and "Johnny Appleseed". Dogg has continued to write and record his music. In 2010 Rev-Ola Records released a compilation of songs from 1967 to 2009 called The Irrepressible Tymon Dogg and Thin Man Press produced a CD of Dogg's soundscape settings of extracts from Louis Aragon's A Wave of Dreams in 2012.

Discography

Solo recordings

With Joe Strummer and The Mescaleros

Guest appearances

References

Further reading

External links
Tymon Dogg – The Godfather of Anti-Folk fan site
Tymon Dogg & The Quikening's Myspace page
Bio at Strummernews
RateYourMusic page

English multi-instrumentalists
Living people
1950 births
People from Formby
20th-century squatters
The Mescaleros members
The 101ers members